Chineze Nwagbo (born November 28, 1982, in Iowa City) a Nigerian American women's basketball player.

Early life and education 
Chineze was born in Iowa City, Iowa to the family of Samuel and Cordelia Nwagbo. She studied Microbiology at Syracuse University, and later pursued a career in sports after her graduation.

Career 
As a Senior, Chineze was the only Orange player to start each of the team's 29 games, With 10.3 points per game and 7.6 rebounds per game, she led the squad in scoring and rebounding, in rebounding, he was ninth in the BIG EAST. As a freshman, Against Providence, she recorded a career-high eight points, four rebounds, one assist, and a steal... For the first time in her career, she grabbed ten rebounds against Seton Hall.

References



Syracuse University alumni
1982 births
Living people